Cabo Blanco Marine Management Area, is a protected area in Costa Rica, managed under the Tempisque Conservation Area, it was created in 2017 by decree 40442-MINAE.

References 

Nature reserves in Costa Rica
Protected areas established in 2017